Eliana Chávez Valencia (born 28 December 1997) is a Colombian sprinter specialising in the 400 metres. She won a gold medal in the 4 × 400 metres relay at the 2018 South American Games.

Her personal best in the event is 53.74 seconds set in Cochabamba in 2018.

International competitions

References

1997 births
Living people
Colombian female sprinters
Athletes (track and field) at the 2018 South American Games
South American Games gold medalists for Colombia
South American Games medalists in athletics
Central American and Caribbean Games bronze medalists for Colombia
Competitors at the 2018 Central American and Caribbean Games
Central American and Caribbean Games medalists in athletics
South American Games gold medalists in athletics
21st-century Colombian women